Horace William Oscar Dixon (1 February 1899 – 7 March 1978) was a New Zealand rugby league player who represented New Zealand.

Playing career
Dixon played for the Devonport club in the Auckland Rugby League competition and represented Auckland.

In 1925, Dixon was selected for New Zealand, becoming Kiwi #168. The squad toured Australia, however no test matches were played on tour.

Dixon represented Auckland in 1927 on their tour of the country. They defeated Canterbury, West Coast-Buller, Otago and Wellington before losing the Northern Union Cup to South Auckland.

Later years
He married the famous New Zealand swimmer Piri Page on 22 March 1930. He died on 7 March 1978.

References

New Zealand rugby league players
New Zealand national rugby league team players
Auckland rugby league team players
North Shore Albions players
North Island rugby league team players
1899 births
1978 deaths